Sand Creek is a  tributary of the Minnesota River in Le Sueur and Scott counties, Minnesota, United States.

Sand Creek was so named on account of the white sandstone rock formations near the creek.

See also
List of rivers of Minnesota
List of longest streams of Minnesota

References

External links
Minnesota Watersheds
USGS Hydrologic Unit Map - State of Minnesota (1974)

Rivers of Minnesota
Rivers of Le Sueur County, Minnesota
Rivers of Scott County, Minnesota